The Airdrome Nieuport 24 is an American amateur-built aircraft, designed and produced by Airdrome Aeroplanes, of Holden, Missouri. The aircraft is supplied as a kit for amateur construction and is available in two versions, the Nieuport 24 and Nieuport 24 bis.

The aircraft is a full-sized replica of the First World War French Nieuport 24 fighter, built from modern materials and powered by modern engines.

Design and development
The Airdrome Nieuport 24 features a strut-braced sesquiplane layout, a single-seat open cockpit, fixed conventional landing gear and a single engine in tractor configuration.

The aircraft is made from bolted-together aluminum tubing, with its flying surfaces covered in doped aircraft fabric. The kit is made up of twelve sub-kits. The standard engine is the  Hirth F30 two stroke engine, with a Volkswagen air-cooled engine four-stroke or a  Rotec R2800 four stroke radial engine optional. Building time from the factory-supplied kit is estimated at 400 hours by the manufacturer.

The replica performs better than the original Nieuport 24 on the same installed power, because modern materials result in a much lighter aircraft.

Operational history
Twelve examples had been completed by December 2011.

Specifications (Airdrome Nieuport 24)

References

Citations

Homebuilt aircraft
Single-engined tractor aircraft
Sesquiplanes